Abductor pollicis muscle can refer to:
 Abductor pollicis brevis muscle (musculus abductor pollicis brevis)
 Abductor pollicis longus muscle (musculus abductor pollicis longus)